This is a list of the Official Lebanese Top 20 number-one songs of 2018. The songs' popularity is determined by radio airplay frequency throughout a given week, audited and compiled by Ipsos SA. The Official Lebanese Top 20 provides two charts: Combined and English (which actually includes all "Western" songs, regardless of their language).

Chart history

References

Lebanon 2018
2018 in Lebanon
Lebanon